The Dartmouth Big Green represented Dartmouth College in ECAC women's ice hockey during the 2014–15 NCAA Division I women's ice hockey season. The Big Green were defeated by powerhouse Clarkson in the ECAC quarterfinals.

Offseason

August 18:Junior Forward Laura Stacey was selected to Team Canada U22Development Team.

Recruiting

2014–15 Big Green

2014-15 Schedule

|-
!colspan=12 style="  style="background:#00693e; color:white;"| Regular Season

|-
!colspan=12 style="  style="background:#00693e; color:white;"| ECAC Tournament

References

Dartmouth
Dartmouth Big Green women's ice hockey seasons
Big
Big